Declan John Galbraith (born 19 December 1991) is a British musician. He is best known for his 2002 hit single,  "Tell Me Why", which peaked at #29 in the UK Singles Chart.

Early life 

Galbraith was born on 19 December 1991, in Hoo St Werburgh Kent, England to Siobhán and Alec Galbraith. His father is English and his mother is Irish. He has a younger sister Bernadette.

When Galbraith was a young boy, his grandfather,  who played several musical instruments in a band, took Galbraith to fleadhs (concerts). The mix of Scottish and Irish musical traditions.

Musical career
Galbraith insisted on performing spontaneously at the annual Rochester Dickens Festival, a two-day extravaganza with his sister Ayannah where people were invited to dress up in Victorian costumes to celebrate the life and times of the famous author Charles Dickens and his links with their town. Galbraith, dressed up as a chimney sweep, started singing. Soon after this, he started to enter local talent contests and within a year he had won 15 titles and more than £1,000. 

As a result of his success in the talent shows, the major recording companies soon heard about Galbraith and he was signed to his first recording contract in England. His first recording was "Walking in the Air", which was released on a special Christmas Hits album, also featuring songs by Westlife, Elton John and Elvis Presley. Among some of his most memorable performances have been the Queen's Jubilee at St Paul's Cathedral, when he sang "Amazing Grace" accompanied by the St. Paul's Choir and a performance in front of more than 22,000 people at an Elton John concert. His first self-titled album, Declan, with Irish traditional songs as well as specially written material became a big success and charted in the UK and Ireland. Within the year of release, it had soon sold 200,000 copies in Germany. 

Another big success came during a nationwide tour of Young Voices concerts when breaking the Guinness World Record. It was at the Odyssey Arena, Belfast in December 2002 when he sang live with some 10,000 children and was also simultaneously linked, by radio and satellite, with more than 80,000 children in their schools all over the UK, who accompanied him in achieving the world's largest choral sing. His talent and reputation came to the attention of media mogul Haim Saban who signed Galbraith to his music group's new record label, Starwatch, and selected Germany as the first site to launch their first album. Galbraith parted company with Starwatch in February 2010 and is reportedly battling major contractual issues that prevent any releases for the time being.  

For some considerable time, Declan has been working on redeveloping his musical career. In 2014, he announced he was planning a comeback. He has started to present his new, self-composed songs in small clubs. Currently, he is working in the studio.

Fame
Galbraith has garnered fame outside the British Isles, especially in China, where his songs were chosen as part of the Chinese education curriculum for learning English. His songs are used to help Chinese children learn English as his songs are easy to remember and suitable for children. In May 2008, Galbraith undertook a successful two cities tour in China, of Beijing and Shenzhen.

Discography

Albums
 Declan (2003)  UK #44
 Thank You (2006) GER # 5
 You and Me (2007) GER # 33
 Greatest Hits (2018)

Singles
 "Tell Me Why" (2002)  UK #29
 "Love of My Life" (2007) GER # 55
 "Ego You" (2007)

Covers
 "An Angel"
 "Tears in Heaven" (2001)
 "Love of My Life" (2007)
 "My Girl" (2007)
 "How Could an Angel Break My Heart"
 "Sailing"
 “Sister Golden Hair”
 "Bright Eyes"
 "Nothing Else Matters"
 "Nights In White Satin"
 "The Last Unicorn"

References

External links

Official Facebook Page
Official Twitter
Official YouTube

1991 births
Living people
21st-century English singers
English child singers
English male singers
English male television actors
Musicians from Kent
Male actors from Kent
People from Hoo St Werburgh
English people of Irish descent
English people of Scottish descent
21st-century British male singers